Goupil may refer to:

People
Eugène Goupil (1831–1896), French Mexican philanthropist and collector
Guillaume François Charles Goupil de Préfelne (1727–1801), member of the Council of Five Hundred
Jeanne Goupil (born 1950), French actress
Linda Goupil (born 1961), Québécois politician
René Goupil (1608–1642), French missionary, one of the first North American martyrs of the Roman Catholic Church
Romain Goupil (born 1951), French cineaste

Places
Manneville-la-Goupil, a commune in the Seine-Maritime department, Haute-Normandie, France

Other
Goupil & Cie, 19th-century French art dealership
Goupil Industrie, a manufacturer of electric vehicles
SMT Goupil, French IT company on the timeline of DOS operating systems